Đovani Roso (born 17 November 1972) is a Croatian retired footballer. Roso was a midfielder, who primarily played as roaming attacking midfielder. Aside from native Croatia, Roso notably played for a number of renowned Israeli clubs, where he became noted for his technique and free kicks. Roso speaks fluent Hebrew and is a naturalized Israeli citizen.

Club career
Roso played for NK Zagreb between 1994 and 1996 before moving to Israel. Roso enjoyed great success in the decade. He played for top teams in Israel, including a campaign in the UEFA Champions League with Maccabi Haifa. He has been acknowledged as being among the very best foreign players to ever play in the Israeli Premier League.

His return to Hajduk Split was ruined by injuries. He only ended up playing four games in the Croatian first league during this stretch. He retired from club football in June 2009.

International career
He made his debut for Croatia in a November 2002 friendly match away against Romania and earned a total of 19 caps, scoring 1 goal. His final international was a June 2004 European Championship game against England in Lisbon.

Post-playing career
Roso appeared as the Pit Stop greeter during Leg 3 of HaMerotz LaMillion 2 ("The Amazing Race: Israel"), which took place in Dubrovnik, Croatia.

In 2015, he participated in the reality TV series "Goalstar". In 2019, he participated and won the reality TV series "Survivor VIP" that was broadcast on Channel 13 in Israel.

Honours
Hapoel Be'er Sheva
Israel State Cup: 1997

Hapoel Haifa
Israeli Championships: 1998–99

Maccabi Haifa
Israeli Championships: 2001–02, 2003–04, 2004–05
Toto Cup: 2001–02

Individual
Israeli Player of the Year: 1998–99, 2001–02

References

External links
 
Stats at Maccabi Haifa

1972 births
Living people
Footballers from Split, Croatia
Croatian people of Italian descent
Association football midfielders
Croatian footballers
Croatia international footballers
UEFA Euro 2004 players
NK Zadar players
NK Zagreb players
Hapoel Be'er Sheva F.C. players
Hapoel Haifa F.C. players
Beitar Jerusalem F.C. players
Maccabi Haifa F.C. players
Maccabi Tel Aviv F.C. players
Winners in the Survivor franchise
HNK Hajduk Split players
Croatian Football League players
Liga Leumit players
Israeli Premier League players
Croatian expatriate footballers
Expatriate footballers in Israel
Croatian expatriate sportspeople in Israel
Survivor (Israeli TV series) contestants
Survivor (franchise) winners
Israeli Footballer of the Year recipients